The Highwaymen were an American country music supergroup, composed of four of country music's biggest artists who pioneered the outlaw country subgenre: Johnny Cash, Waylon Jennings, Willie Nelson, and Kris Kristofferson. Between 1985 and 1995, the group recorded three major label albums as The Highwaymen: two on Columbia Records and one for Liberty Records. Their Columbia works produced three chart singles, including the number one "Highwayman" in 1985.

Between 1996 and 1999, Nelson, Kristofferson, Cash, and Jennings provided the voice and dramatization for the Louis L'Amour Collection, a four-CD box set of seven Louis L'Amour stories published by the HighBridge Company, although the four were not credited as "The Highwaymen" in this work.

Besides the four formal members of the group, one other vocal artist appeared on a Highwaymen recording: Johnny Rodriguez, who provided Spanish vocal on "Deportee", a Woody Guthrie composition, from the album Highwayman.

The four starred in one movie together: the 1986 film Stagecoach.

In 1990, the original members of  the 1950s-'60s folk group of the same name sued The Highwaymen over their use of the name, which was inspired by a Jimmy Webb ballad the country stars had recorded. The suit was dropped when all parties agreed that the folk group owned the name but that the earlier group would grant a nonexclusive, nontransferable license to the supergroup to use the name. The two groups then shared the stage at a 1990 concert in Hollywood.

Albums

Highwayman
Formed in 1985, the group did not have an official name when they released their first two albums on Columbia Records. The first album, Highwayman, was credited to "Nelson, Jennings, Cash, Kristofferson". The single "Highwayman", a Jimmy Webb composition, became a #1 country hit. Their cover of Guy Clark's "Desperados Waiting for a Train" reached the Top 20. The album was produced by Chips Moman.

Highwayman 2
In 1990, the 4 members reunited for a second effort, titled Highwayman 2, which reached #4 on the country album chart. The Lee Clayton-penned song "Silver Stallion" was the first single and made the country Top 40. The album was nominated for a Grammy for Best Country Vocal Collaboration. Highwayman 2 was produced, once again, by Moman. Six of the songs were written or co-written by members of the group.

The Road Goes on Forever
The group's final release (now listed as "Highwaymen") prior to Jennings's death in 2002 was 1995's Don Was-produced album The Road Goes on Forever, (a Robert Earl Keen cover), with the single, "It Is What It Is". A tenth-anniversary edition of The Road Goes on Forever appeared in 2005, with several bonus tracks added as well as, in some versions, a DVD containing the video for "It Is What It Is" and a documentary titled Live Forever – In the Studio with the Highwaymen.

The band continued to tour into the late 1990s, before Jennings and Cash both started to decline in health, which prevented them from maintaining a full touring schedule. All four continued to perform as solo artists, with Jennings briefly joining Old Dogs; Jennings died in 2002 and Cash died in 2003.

"Those tours and the records we made were a great time," recalled Kristofferson in 2010. "I just wish I was more aware of how lucky I was to share a stage with those people. I had no idea that two of them would be done so soon. Hell, I was up there and I had all my heroes with me. These are guys whose ashtrays I used to clean. I'm kinda amazed I wasn't more amazed."

Discography

Studio albums

Compilation albums

Singles

Notes:
A "Born and Raised in Black and White" did not chart on Hot Country Songs, but peaked at No. 1 on Hot Country Radio Breakouts.

Videography

Music videos

Video albums

References

External links
 

American country music groups
Country music supergroups
Musical quartets
Johnny Cash
Willie Nelson
Musical groups established in 1985
Musical groups disestablished in 1995
Columbia Records artists
Liberty Records artists
1985 establishments in the United States
1995 disestablishments in the United States